Wiggly Park was a British BBC children's television animated cartoon which was produced in 1997 and shown in 1998. Originally a children's radio programme on BBC Radio 5, the characters were voiced by British actors Andrew Sachs and Kate Sachs.

The original radio show was broadcast as a segment in the weekday morning children's programme '12345' presented by 'Ian' on BBC Radio 5.

The show revolved around the adventures of six friends in their home, a large town park.
The characters included an earthworm named E.W., a slug named Nifty (who was characterised as being rather slow and a bit dim), a snail called Shelly, (who was French and female) Moggy the caterpillar who was very greedy, Buzz the bee, and a tortoise named Thera who was very old.

Repeats of the CBBC series were later repeated on Nick Jr, Tiny Pop and Tiny Living in the early 2000s.

It later aired on PBS in the U.S. as part of their Someday School programming block

Episodes

Series 1

The Birthday Present (9 January 1998)
Rodeo Slug (16 January 1998)
Tunnel Vision (23 January 1998)
Nifty's Balloon Flight (30 January 1998)
Me, Argue? (6 February 1998)
The Snail Princess (13 February 1998)
The Birthday Worm (20 February 1998)
Who Am I? (27 February 1998)
Je m'appelle Nifty (6 March 1998)
Sleep Slithering (13 March 1998)
Homesick Snail (17 March 1998)
Frog's Legs (24 March 1998)
Nifty to the Rescue (31 March 1998)

Series 2

That's Stretching It (10 September 1998)
The Last Rose (17 September 1998)
Moggy Catches A Cold (24 September 1998)
The Wiggly Lake Monster (1 October 1998)
Shelly Has A Shock (8 October 1998)
EW Measures Up (15 October 1998)
Turn Over Thera (22 October 1998)
A Loose Thread (30 November 1998)
Soapy Snack (7 December 1998)
Gnome From Ome (14 December 1998)
Home Truths (21 December 1998)
Missing Slug (4 January 1999)
The Art Competition (11 January 1999)

References

External links
 Info at: 
 List of episodes and short clip available to view at: 

BBC children's television shows
Nick Jr. original programming
1998 British television series debuts
1999 British television series endings
1990s British children's television series
British children's animated adventure television series
British preschool education television series
1990s British animated television series
CBeebies
Animated preschool education television series
1990s preschool education television series